Odontaster is a genus of sea stars. The type species is Odontaster hispidus.

Species
The following species are listed in the World Register of Marine Species:

Odontaster aucklandensis McKnight, 1973
Odontaster australis H.L.Clark, 1926
Odontaster benhami (Mortensen, 1925)
Odontaster crassus Fisher, 1905
Odontaster hispidus Verrill, 1880
Odontaster mediterraneus (Marenzeller, 1893)
Odontaster meridionalis (E.A. Smith, 1876)
Odontaster pearsei Janosik & Halanych, 2010
Odontaster penicillatus (Philippi, 1870)
Odontaster robustus Verrill, 1899
Odontaster rosagemmae McKnight, 2001
Odontaster roseus Janosik & Halanych, 2010
Odontaster setosus (Verrill, 1899)
Odontaster validus Koehler, 1906

References

Odontasteridae